Lake Icaria is a reservoir located 4 miles north of Corning, Iowa in Adams County along Iowa Highway 148.  It was built as part of the Watershed Protection and Flood Prevention Act and was completed in 1978.  It is fed by Walters Creek in its northwest corner with its dam located on the west side on the lake.  Its dam is 1,300 feet long and 56.5 feet high.

The lake has a beach, marina, playgrounds, picnic shelters, cabins, primitive campground, non-primitive campground, and numerous nature trails.  Lake Icaria offers great fishing with largemouth bass, bluegill, crappie, channel catfish, perch, walleye, and wiper.  Boating and camping are very popular, bringing in visitors from all over Iowa, Missouri, and Nebraska.

External links 
 Iowa Department of Natural Resources'  Lake Icaria site
 My County Parks' Lake Icaria site

Icaria
Icaria
Dams in Iowa